The Spirit of the Lake is a 1921 American short silent Western film produced by Cyrus J. Williams and distributed by Pathé Exchange. It was directed by Robert North Bradbury and stars Tom Santschi, Bessie Love, and Ruth Stonehouse.

This short film was part of the "Santschi Series", which included the other short films The Honor of Rameriz, The Heart of Doreon, Lorraine of the Timberlands, and Mother o' Dreams, all of which starred Santschi.

The film is presumed lost.

Plot 
A hermit who lives by a lake falls for a distressed young woman whom he aids.

Cast 
 Tom Santschi
 Bessie Love
 Ruth Stonehouse
 Edward Hearn
 Tom Lingham

Production 
Some outdoor scenes were filmed at Keen's Camp in Riverside County.

Release 
Upon its release, some theaters showed this short with The Idle Rich; some other theaters showed it with a re-release of Chaplin's Carmen.

References

External links 
 

1921 films
1921 Western (genre) films
1921 lost films
American black-and-white films
Lost American films
Lost Western (genre) films
Silent American Western (genre) films
1920s American films